Cristiano Lombardi (born 19 August 1995) is an Italian footballer who plays as a right winger for  club Triestina on loan from Lazio.

Club career
Product of Lazio youth system, in the 2014–2015 season he was sent on loan to Serie B club Trapani, where he played 12 appearances. In the 2015–2016 season he was sent on loan to Lega Pro club Ancona, where he played 12 appearances and scoring 4 goals.

He made his return in Lazio's first team for the 2016–17 season, making his Serie A debut on 22 August 2016, in the match win 4–3 against Atalanta at Stadio Atleti Azzurri d'Italia, where he scored his debut goal.

On 31 August 2017, Lombardi was loaned to Serie A newcomers Benevento on a season-long deal.

On 15 January 2019, Lombardo joined on loan to Venezia until 30 June 2020.

On 17 July 2019, Lombardi joined Salernitana on loan until 30 June 2020.

On 31 January 2022, Lombardi was loaned to Reggina.

On 3 August 2022, Lombardi moved on loan to Triestina, with Triestina holding an obligation to purchase his rights in case of their promotion to Serie B.

Career statistics

Club

References

Living people
1995 births
People from Viterbo
Footballers from Lazio
Association football wingers
Italian footballers
Italy youth international footballers
S.S. Lazio players
Trapani Calcio players
Benevento Calcio players
U.S. Ancona 1905 players
Venezia F.C. players
U.S. Salernitana 1919 players
Reggina 1914 players
U.S. Triestina Calcio 1918 players
Serie A players
Serie B players
Serie C players
Sportspeople from the Province of Viterbo